The Citadel of Pamplona or The New Castle (in euskera, iruñeko zitadela; in Spanish, Ciudadela de Pamplona) is an old military renaissance fort, constructed between the 16th and 17th centuries in the city of Pamplona, the capital of the Navarre Community (Spain). At present a large part of the fort it is still standing in a public park with cultural activities taking place in its buildings.

In 2015, UNESCO's approval  for the further development of the Camino de Santiago de Compostela  in Spain (The Camino de Santiago de Compostela: The French Camino and the Caminos in the North of Spain), Spain sent  "Retrospective Inventory – Associated Componenets" documentation to where the Pamplona Citadel is located at No. 180.

Construction 
Philip II of Spain ordered his construction in 1571, following a plan for renovation and general reinforcement of the city walls. The engineer in charge of designing it was the military engineer Giacomo Palearo, who goes by the name "el Fratin", the viceroy of Navarra Vespasiano Gonzaga y Colonna also participated. They devised a defensive system in line with the theory of the Italian Renaissance which had been put into practice shortly before in the city of Antwerp, with the citadel carried out by Francesco Paciotto, who also helped to construct Turin. It was an enclosure in the shape of five-pointed star. All the possible angles of attack were controlled from each point of the star shaped border. Two of the points were pointed towards the interior of the city to control that area, as stated in the documents at the time, the engineer Antonelli informed Philip II in 1569. "Pamplona is now more protected than a metropolis.. It has to have a main castle, so that the memory of the natural king's governance remains … it's still necessary to secure with strength, against their wills.. The work should serve to defend against the extrinsic danger, and also intrinsic." Do not forget that the Conquest of the Kingdom of Navarre had occurred, with incidents of reconquest with the active participation of its population. According to Alicia Cámara in the work of Muraria, the "Citadel should be understood as a way to dominate a city from which it was possible to expect a rebellion" and as the Venetian ambassador Contarini warned that "everyone in this kingdom have hatred for the Spanish and want their natural king Juan de Albret to return".

The denominations of the bastions are: San Antón, el Real, Santa María, Santiago and Victoria.

It can be concluded in 1645, even then it was reinforced with exterior "half moons" in 1685 and in the first half of the 18th century, which reinforced the defensive system.

This reinforcement was made based on the project of Juan de Ledesma, following the poliorcetic system known as "de Vauban", by the name of the military engineer who renewed military engineering in the time of Louis XIV. They constructed two half moons between the Bastions of Santiago and Victoria ( toward the Taconera gate), and between the San Antón y El Real (towards the San Nicolás gate.) In addition, on the sides between the bastions of Santiago, Santa María and El Real, also rose defenses that surrounded them on both fronts, improving their defensive capacity.

The Strength of the Citadel 

The citadel of Pamplona has not suffered significant defensive attacks. It has therefore rarely been besieged, although it has been taken. On February 16, 1808, Napoléon's French army under the command of General D’Armagnac, who by the treaty of Fontainebleau with King Charles IV, was allowed to cross the Iberian Peninsula for the Invasion of Portugal. With a strategic ambush, he invaded the city. His troops entered on February 9, 1808 through the San Nicolás gateway (located in Segundo Ensanche, in the centre of Pamplona, at the crossroads of Calle Cortes de Navarra and Calle San Ignacio). The officers stayed in the nobles houses of the city and the rest of the soldiers, up to 4,000, were stationed in different areas. This situation was tense, which lead to a street brawl resulting in one of the soldiers being stabbed to death. In the increasingly hostile environment, Napoleon ordered D'Armagnac to take over the city. The plan was to take advantage of a snowstorm on February 16 when French soldiers approached the city playing snowball games in front of the defenders. When they were near, they took out the weapons they had hidden in their clothes and managed to enter and take over the city.

Similar strategies were effectively used against the Napoleonic troops in other later seizures of citadels and castles (the citadel of Barcelona and Montjuic Castle by Duhesme on February 28, the citadel of Figueras by Colonel Piat and The Mota Castle of San Sebastián).

In 1823 the liberal soldiers offered greater resistance for five months before the army of the Hundred Thousand Sons of St. Louis. The intention was to besiege it, without taking it, to prevent the departure of the soldiers, while the rest of the army went all over the peninsula to restore absolutism. Subsequently, on September 3, they began bombing the city of Pamplona. On September 16, after another heavy bombing, they surrendered.

During the Spanish Civil War, the rebels carried out numerous executions of Republicans at the Socorro Gate amid the Spanish Civil War, through a very harsh repression in Navarre. A plaque was placed in his memory in 2007 that was replaced in March 2012 by a monolith with the same text in the area of the moats near the street, Socorro Gate. The inscription, in Spanish and Basque, reads as follows:

The city council and the city of Pamplona as a tribute to the 298 residents shot in 1936 for defending freedom and social justice.

The Citadel Today  
In 1964, the town of Pamplona was no longer used by the military. The military part of Pamplona was turned into a popular park (known in Spanish as  La Planta de la Ciudadela) with the old military buildings being used for cultural events.

Some buildings located in the inner section of the park are preserved.  These historic military buildings were taken care of after the city received the fortified enclosure that surrounds the park.

The following buildings were;

The ammunition dump of 1694 by Torelli.
The warehouse for mixed goods, renovated by Ignacio Sala in 1720.
The artillery room was designed by the well-known engineer Jorge Próspero Verboom in 1725. Próspero was also the designer of the citadel of Barcelona.

Currently the park is located in the centre of the city. The park is surrounded on all sides by another famous park in Pamplona known as Vuelta del Castillo, which has remained the largest area for greenery in Pamplona throughout the years with no military buildings being built in this area.

After the installation of the parks to the city in combination with the historical military park (known in Spanish as La Planta de la Ciudadela), including outside spaces it adds up to a total area of 275,840m₂ which was made official on July 23, 1966.  Various possibilities were suggested for the purpose that should be given to it. In order to resolve this, an enquiry was launched in 1971 in different parts of the city.  The result of this enquiry was that the military park along with the adjacent land, such as "the green areas with restored historical buildings" were to be given regular maintenance.  It was proposed that these areas were the most valued areas of the city and as such it was suggested to leave these areas to be exclusively an area untouched by the construction of new buildings. The area was only to be habituated to a small "medieval city" or used for sports events.

In 1972, the City Council decided to leave the old artillery building where it was originally located (next to Yanguas and Miranda street at the eastern end of the Citadel where the bus station has now been built) in order to respect the surroundings of the fort. In December, the council requested for the government to declare the military park as a Natural Historic-Artistic Monument.  The request was granted the following year, thanks to decree 332 on February 8 in 1973.

The Citadel was designed to be a perfect five-pointed star pentagon. However, at the end of the 19th and at the beginning of the 20th century, the strongholds of Saint Anthony and Victoria (the two pointed towards the centre of the city) were partially demolished. This was done to allow the construction of the first residential expansion of Pamplona. With some new houses and new barracks outside the city walls, as well as the street, Avenida del Ejército in 1971, it determined its current shape.

The House of Congress and the Auditorium of Navarre (an autonomous community located in a province in northern Spain) were built on the remains of the Saint Anthony stronghold.  In November 2007, the city had finished building the new bus station in Pamplona. The station was constructed and buried under a glacis, next to the citadel.

References 

 The Retrospective Inventory - Associated Components, produced in 2014, can be consulted on the official UNESCO website under the heading "Routes of Santiago de Compostela: Camino Francés and Routes of Northern Spain", in the Documents section, in the archive "Nomination file 669bis" (285 MB), available online at:   https://whc.unesco.org/es/list/669/documents/ Accessed July 31, 2017.
 200 años de la caída de la Ciudadela. Reportaje de Iván Giménez en Diario de Noticias de Navarra el 17 de febrero de 2008
 Jimeno Jurío, José María (2007). Navarra en la época moderna y contemporánea. Pamplona: Pamiela.  
 Resolución del pleno del ayuntamiento de Pamplona del 21 de septiembre de 2007, que fue propuesta por NaBai y apoyada por PSN y ANV, con la oposición de UPN.
 [http://www.noticiasdenavarra.com/2012/03/30/vecinos/pamplona/upn-obedece-al-pleno-y-coloca-el-monolito-de-los-fusilados-en-1936. UPN obedece al pleno y coloca el monolito de los fusilados en 1936. Diario de Noticias. March 30, 2012
Decreto del General Franco, Jefe del Estado Español, de 21 de mayo de 1964, por el que se cede a la ciudad de Pamplona el conjunto histório
 El Ejército entrega al Ayuntamiento de Pamplona la Ciudadela, Diario Vasco, 24 de julio de 1966

Bibliography 

 Víctor Echarri Iribarren (2000). The walls and the Pamplona Citadel.. Publications Fund of the Government of Navarra. .
 F. Idoate (1954). The fortifications of Pamplona from the conquest of Navarra. Reprinted from the "Prince of Viana Magazine", Provincial Council of Navarra.
 Sarasa Asiáin, Alfredo (2006). Architecture guide of Pamplona and its region. Pamplona: official Basque-Navarro architects' school. 
 Martinena Ruiz, Juan José (1987). The Citadel of Pamplona (Short collection of Pamplona themes, vol 11).. Pamplona: Pamplona: City Hall of Pamplona/Iruñeko Udala.

External links 
 200 years since the fall of the Citadel. Report by Iván Giménez in the news journal of Navarra on the 17th of February 2008
 Site of the walls of Pamplona. City Council of Pamplona

Buildings and structures in Navarre
Fortifications in Spain
Bien de Interés Cultural landmarks in Navarre
Parks in Spain